Derbyshire County Cricket Club in 1886 represents the cricket season when the English club Derbyshire had been playing for fifteen years and was the penultimate season before they lost first class status for seven years.

1886 season

Derbyshire CCC played nine county games in 1886, and two other first class matches which were against MCC and Australians. Their only first class win was against MCC and the poor performance contributed to the club losing first class status at the end of the following year. They also played two non first class matches against Essex, which were both wins for Derbyshire and included a century for W Chatterton and 8 for 48 by Davidson

The captain for the year was Edmund Maynard. The top scorer was William Chatterton. William Cropper and "G G" Walker shared the top bowling spot.

George Davidson, who became one of Derbyshire's leading bowlers made his debut in 1886. James Stubbings and A S Sugden played for Derbyshire in the matches against Essex.

Several players made their final appearances for Derbyshire in the season. George Hay had first played in 1875 although he had played few games since 1880. William Wood-Sims and Joseph Marlow had first played in 1879 and Stephen Doughty in 1880. Ludford Docker who first played in 1881 went to Birmingham to set up the family firm and Alfred Cochrane who had played several games since 1884 tok up employment in Northumberland. Frank Sugg had also joined Derbyshire in 1884 but moved on to Lancashire. Joseph Chatterton, brother of William and a player of promise died at the age of 19 in November 1886.

Matches

Statistics

First-class batting averages

William Chatterton, Frank Sugg, William Cropper, GG Walker and James Disney played first class matched for other teams during the season.

First-class bowling averages

Wicket keeping

James Disney Catches 13 Stumping 3

See also
Derbyshire County Cricket Club seasons
1886 English cricket season

References

1886 in English cricket
Derbyshire County Cricket Club seasons
English cricket seasons in the 19th century